Dick Norman (born 1 March 1971) is a former professional tennis player from Belgium. He achieved a degree of folk popularity among tennis fans due to his height (6 feet 8 inches), his left-handed power game and, in the last few years of his career, his age (between late 2006 and his retirement in June 2013 he was the oldest player on the ATP Tour).

After retirement Norman became involved in coaching and organizing local tennis events. In March 2018, he became the tournament director of ATP Antwerp, also known as the European Open.

Career
Turning professional in 1991, Norman notched up only his 14th Grand Slam appearance at the 2006 Wimbledon, where, at 35, he was the second oldest male competitor, to Andre Agassi. With Agassi's retirement immediately following the 2006 US Open, Norman succeeded him as the oldest active player on the ATP tour.

In 1995, he made it to the fourth round at Wimbledon, despite qualifying out of the lucky loser's draw. He defeated successive but aging former Wimbledon Champions Pat Cash and Stefan Edberg in the first and second rounds respectively, then doubles guru Todd Woodbridge in the third round, before falling to another former champion Boris Becker in the fourth round. It was the furthest that any player had ever advanced in a Grand Slam Tournament coming out of the lucky loser draw. This feat was equalled by compatriot David Goffin at the 2012 French Open.

He disappeared from the tennis scene after a few unimpressive seasons, but has made a resurgence starting in 2003, at the age of 32, a common retirement age. He qualified for three of the four annual Grand Slam tournaments in 2003, 2005, and 2006. Nine of his 14 Grand Slam appearances have come after his 32nd birthday, although except for a surprise run in doubles at the French Open in 2009, none as successful as his 1995 Wimbledon run. He mostly lost in the first or second round. Still he has exceeded $1 million in career earnings, in large part due to his Grand Slam successes.

In November 2006, at the age of 35 years and eight months, Norman attained his career-high ATP singles ranking of world No. 85.

In July 2007, at Newport, Norman made it to his very first ATP semifinal, defeating eighth seed Michael Berrer along the way. His first round win was over fellow "giant", 6'9" wild card John Isner, who was playing in his first-ever ATP match.

As of February 2008, he remained the oldest active player on the ATP Tour at 36 years and 11 months; and although his ranking had dropped back to world No. 169, partly as a result of his having taken a break of several months from the tour over the preceding autumn and winter following the birth of his first child, he appeared to remain committed to continuing his career on the circuit.

While Norman was the oldest player on the tour, Jimmy Connors continued to compete regularly until the week of 10 May 1993, when he was 40 years and 8 months of age and played another six isolated tournaments over the three years to follow, the last of which took place in the week of 29 April 1996, when he was 43 years and 7 months old.

He has won over ten titles on the Challenger circuit, the most recent being at Mexico City in April 2009, at the age of 38. In January 2007, he teamed with countryman Xavier Malisse to win the doubles title at the ATP event in Chennai. In early 2009, he made the conscious decision to focus more on doubles than singles, and in February he joined forces with American James Cerretani to win the doubles title at the ATP World Tour event in Johannesburg.

In 2009, Norman teamed with South African Wesley Moodie and advanced to the final of the French Open. They lost 6–3, 3–6, 2–6 to the third seeded pair of Lukáš Dlouhý and Leander Paes. It is by far the furthest Norman has advanced in a Grand Slam tournament. It was the first time in his 19-year career that Norman had played doubles at the French Open, and only the third tournament in which Moodie (who with Stephen Huss won the Wimbledon doubles title in 2005) and Norman played together.

In the semifinals, Norman-Moodie saved three match points in a come-from-behind 0–6, 7–6, 6–4 victory over the defending champions, Bob and Mike Bryan, the second seeds. The Bryans had won the previous two Grand Slam titles, the 2008 US Open and the 2009 Australian Open. On their way to the final, Norman-Moodie had in the first round upset the seventh seed team of Max Mirnyi and Andy Ram.

In finishing runner-up for the 2009 French Open title, Norman earned 78,000 euros. The finish moved him to a career-high No. 32 in the ATP doubles rankings.

At 38 years and 3 months, Norman became the oldest male to reach a French Open final in the Open Era (since surpassed by Jean-Julien Rojer in winning the title at the 2022 French Open). He became the fifth player aged 38 or older to play in a men's doubles Grand Slam title match: Neale Fraser (39) was runner-up at Wimbledon in 1973, Ken Rosewall (38) lost the US Open final in 1973, Sherwood Stewart (38) won the Australian Open in 1984, and Bob Hewitt (38) won Wimbledon in 1978.

Two weeks later, he won the Ordina Open with his partner Wesley Moodie. It was his first grass-court title.

In November, he won the AXA Belgian Masters, as oldest man in the field.

In another career highlight, Dick (along with partner Moodie) qualified for the 2010 ATP World Tour Finals. This was the first time in his career that Dick qualified for the ATP World Tour Finals. Dick and Wesley entered the final tournament of the season, the 2010 BNP Paribas Masters, seeded eighth. Because Jürgen Melzer and Philipp Petzschner won 2010 Wimbledon, only the top seven ranked pairs qualified for the finals. Due to Dick and Wesley reaching the quarterfinals in Paris and František Čermák and Michal Mertiňák failing to reach the finals in Paris, Dick and Wesley were able to secure qualification.

Norman retired in June 2013, following a first-round defeat in the Rosmalen Grass Court Championships, having enjoyed a tennis career of 22 years.

Grand Slam finals

Doubles: 1 (0–1)

ATP career finals

Doubles: 7 (4 titles, 3 runner-ups)

ATP Challenger and ITF Futures finals

Singles: 30 (19–11)

Doubles: 26 (11–15)

Performance timelines

Singles

Doubles

Mixed Doubles

External links
 
 
 
 Norman world ranking history
 Dick Norman's website

1971 births
Living people
Belgian male tennis players
Sportspeople from West Flanders
People from Waregem